The Sheffield Amateur League was a football competition for clubs in the Sheffield area of England. For many years it was behind only the Sheffield Association League in terms of seniority in the Sheffield and Hallamshire Football Association area.

Honours

League champions

References

 
Defunct football leagues in England
Defunct football competitions in South Yorkshire
1904 establishments in England
Sports leagues established in 1904
1987 disestablishments in England
Sports leagues disestablished in 1987